John Douglas Woodford (born 9 September 1943, Little Horton, Bradford, Yorkshire, England) is an English  first-class cricketer, who played for Yorkshire County Cricket Club from 1968 to 1973, and appeared subsequently for Northumberland in the Minor Counties Cricket Championship.

Woodford is a right-handed batsman, who scored 1,204 first-class runs in thirty eight matches with a highest score of 101, his only century.  In seventy four List A one day games, he compiled 951 runs at an average of 21.61, with a best score of 69 not out.  Although he only took four first-class wickets, he was more successful in the limited over format, snaring 79 victims with his medium pacers at 21.01.

References

External links
Cricinfo Profile

1943 births
Living people
English cricketers
Yorkshire cricketers
Northumberland cricketers
People from Little Horton
Minor Counties cricketers
Cricketers from Yorkshire